Bensalem means "son of peace" or "son of submission". It is composed of two Semitic words; either 1) "ben" (בן) - "son", and "salem" or "shalem" (שלם) - "whole" or "complete"; or 2) "ben" (בן) - "son", and "salam" (سلام) - "peace".

It may refer to:

People
 Ben Salem Himmich, Moroccan novelist
 Zinedine Bensalem, Algerian footballer
 Zohra Bensalem, Algerian volleyball player
 Ahmed Ben Salem, Algerian leader

Places
 Bensalem High School, public high school in Bensalem, Pennsylvania
 Bensalem Township, Pennsylvania, township in Bucks County, Pennsylvania
 Bensalem Township School District, School district in Bucks County, Pennsylvania

See also
 New Atlantis